Sarra Mzougui (born 8 March 1994) is a Tunisian judoka. She won the gold medal in her event at the 2022 African Judo Championships held in Oran, Algeria. She is also a two-time medalist at the African Games.

In 2019, she won one of the bronze medals in the women's 78 kg event at the African Judo Championships held in Cape Town, South Africa.

At the 2021 African Judo Championships held in Dakar, Senegal, she won one of the bronze medals in her event.

Achievements

References

External links
 
 

Living people
1994 births
Place of birth missing (living people)
Tunisian female judoka
African Games medalists in judo
African Games silver medalists for Tunisia
African Games bronze medalists for Tunisia
Competitors at the 2015 African Games
Competitors at the 2019 African Games
Mediterranean Games competitors for Tunisia
Competitors at the 2018 Mediterranean Games
Islamic Solidarity Games competitors for Tunisia
Islamic Solidarity Games medalists in judo
21st-century Tunisian women